Carabinier originally a cavalry soldier armed with a carbine, may also refer to the following:

Army
150th Battalion (Carabiniers Mont-Royal), CEF, was a unit in the Canadian Expeditionary Force during the First World War.
2nd Carabinier Regiment (France), was a French cavalry regiment.
3rd Carabiniers, a cavalry regiment of the British Army.
Carabiniers (6th Dragoon Guards), was a cavalry regiment of the British Army.
Carabiniers-à-Cheval, were mounted troops in the service of France.
Compagnie des Carabiniers du Prince, is the Infantry division of the Force Publique of Monaco.
Mobile Carabinier Squadrons, specialised units of the Colombian National Police, part of its Directorate of Carabineers and Rural Security (Dirección de Carabineros y Seguridad Rural or DICAR).
Regiment Carabiniers Prins Boudewijn – Grenadiers, is an infantry regiment in the Land Component of the Belgian Armed Forces.

Culture
Carabinier, a traditional folk dance of Haiti.
The Carabineers, a French 1963 film and was the fifth narrative feature by French filmmaker Jean-Luc Godard.

See also
Carabiner, a safety device used in rock climbing.
Carabinieri,  is the national military police of Italy.